John Van Buren (1810–1866) was an American politician, and son of President Martin Van Buren.

John Van Buren may also refer to:

John Van Buren (U.S. representative) (1799–1855), US congressman from New York
John D. Van Buren (1811–1885), New York assemblyman
John D. Van Buren Jr. (1838–1918), New York engineer and politician
John J. Van Buren, US Navy officer and pilot

See also
USS John J. Van Buren (DE-753), a US Navy destroyer escort
USS Van Buren, two ships